Anicet Kayodé Adjamossi (born 15 March 1984 in Porto Novo) is a Beninese former professional footballer who played as a defender.

International career
Adjamossi was part of the Beninese 2004 African Nations Cup team which finished bottom of their group in the first round of competition, thus failing to secure qualification for the quarter-finals.

References

External links
 

1984 births
Living people
People from Porto-Novo
Yoruba sportspeople
Association football defenders
Beninese footballers
Benin international footballers
2004 African Cup of Nations players
2008 Africa Cup of Nations players
Ligue 2 players
FC Girondins de Bordeaux players
FC Istres players
US Créteil-Lusitanos players
Entente SSG players
Mogas 90 FC players
Racing de Ferrol footballers
MFK Topvar Topoľčany players
La Vitréenne FC players
Saint-Colomban Sportive Locminé players
Beninese expatriate footballers
Beninese expatriate sportspeople in France
Expatriate footballers in France